The Bailey Colony Farm, also known as the Estelle Farm, is a historic Matanuska Colony farmstead that dates from 1935.  It is located along the Glenn Highway near Palmer, Alaska in Matanuska-Susitna Borough. It was part of a New Deal program opening farms in Alaska as part of assisting overpopulated rural areas of the lower 48 states of the US, in a program conceived of by FERA architect David Williams.

The Bailey Colony Farm was listed on the National Register of Historic Places in 1991.  The listing included two contributing buildings.
It was the home of Ferber and Ruth Bailey and their children, who were colonists from Wisconsin.  The house is a  -story building with a gambrel roof;  the barn is a  log and frame built building also with a gambrel roof.  Both were built in 1935.  The barn was moved about 150 feet in the 1940s to its present location, when the Glenn Highway was widened.

See also 
Matanuska Valley Colony
National Register of Historic Places listings in Matanuska-Susitna Borough, Alaska

References

Buildings and structures completed in 1935
Farms on the National Register of Historic Places in Alaska
Historic districts on the National Register of Historic Places in Alaska
Buildings and structures on the National Register of Historic Places in Matanuska-Susitna Borough, Alaska
1935 establishments in Alaska